Katharina Häcker (born 25 December 1986 in Mannheim) is a German former competitive figure skater. She won the 2003 European Youth Olympic Festival, 2011 Bavarian Open, and 2002 German national title. She competed at two World Junior Championships, finishing sixth in 2001.

Häcker missed the 2005–06 and 2006–07 seasons due to injury.

Programs

Competitive highlights
JGP: Junior Grand Prix

References 

 2010 Heiko Fischer Pokal
 2011 Bavarian Open

External links

 

German female single skaters
Living people
1986 births
Sportspeople from Mannheim